The Blake's hitch is a friction hitch commonly used by arborists and tree climbers as an ascending knot.  Unlike other common climbing hitches, which often use a loop of cord, the Blake's hitch is formed using the end of a rope.  Although it is a stable knot, it is often backed up with a stopper knot, such as a figure-of-eight knot, for safety.  It is used for both ascending and descending, and is preferred by many arborists over other hitches, such as the taut-line hitch, as it is less prone to binding.

History
The first known presentation of this knot was made by Heinz Prohaska in an Austrian
guides periodical in 1981; in 1990, he presented it in a caving journal, Nylon Highway.
Separately, Jason Blake discovered the knot for himself and presented it to the arborist community
in a letter to Arbor Age in 1994, after which it was enthusiastically adopted by arborists.  It has since become well 
known under the name "Blake's hitch".

Usage
This hitch has two conventional forms – the 4/2 and the 5/3 – although other variations are possible. The 5/3 version has the tail pass up through the bottom three turns of the coil which has five total turns. In the 4/2 version the tail passes up through two of the four coils. The hitch is dressed and set tight enough to provide enough grip for the applied load without being tighter than necessary. This hitch is most commonly used with 12-13mm (1/2 inch) static climbing ropes.  (Heinz has advised that where slippage of the base, "4/2" knot seems to result from extra slippery rope(s), add a turn to the away end (i.e., that end beyond the tucked tail); if slippage seems to result from rope stiffness, add a turn at the near end, resulting in the "5/3".)

Tying 
In practice it helps to insert the thumb under the lower turns since this facilitates threading the tail in later.  After passing the tail round the standing end, the tail then must pass back behind the standing line and up through the desired number of turns of the coil.  A stopper knot is then added to the dangling tail to prevent any chance of it pulling out.

Tying this incorrectly, too easily can make a knot called SuiSlide(picture) that fails as implied.

See also
List of knots
List of friction hitch knots

References 
Son of a Hitch: A Genealogy of Arborists’ Climbing Hitches

External links 
Notable Knot Index: Blake's Hitch (Prohaska Hitch)

Hitch knots